The Premier League Player of the Season is an annual association football award presented to players in England, which recognises the most outstanding player in the Premier League each season.  The recipient is chosen by a panel assembled by the league's sponsors consisting of members of "football's governing bodies, the media and fans", and is announced in the second or third week of May.  For sponsorship purposes, from 1994 to 2001 it was called the Carling Player of the Year; from 2001 to 2004 as the Barclaycard Player of the Year; and from 2004 to 2016 as the Barclays Player of the Season. Since the 2016–17 season, it is called the EA Sports Player of the Season.

The Premier League was founded in 1992, when the clubs of the First Division left the Football League and established a new commercially independent league that negotiated its own broadcast and sponsorship agreements. The newly formed league had no sponsor for its inaugural season until Carling agreed to a four-year £12 million deal that started the following season.  That same season, Carling introduced individual awards for players, such as the Golden Boot. However, the Player of the Month and Player of the Season awards were only first bestowed during the 1994–95 season.  The first Player of the Season award was given to Blackburn Rovers striker Alan Shearer, who won the Premier League title with his team and the Golden Boot that season.

Thierry Henry, Cristiano Ronaldo, Nemanja Vidić and Kevin De Bruyne have been Player of the Season on two occasions each and are the only players to have won the award more than once, with Ronaldo having achieved this in consecutive years (2007 and 2008).  Eight players were the Premier League's leading goalscorer and won the Golden Boot alongside the Player of the Season award.  Four of these players – Kevin Phillips, Henry, Ronaldo and Luis Suárez – went on to win the European Golden Shoe in the same season.  11 players have won the Premier League trophy with their respective clubs in the same year they received the award, with Ronaldo and Vidić each accomplishing the feat on two occasions with Manchester United. Ronaldo is the only player to be named Player of the Season and win the FIFA World Player of the Year; when he accomplished this in 2008, he became the first player from the Premier League to be voted the world's top footballer.

Winners

Awards won by nationality

Awards won by position

Awards won by club

See also
Premier League Player of the Month
FWA Footballer of the Year
PFA Players' Player of the Year
Premier League Goal of the Season
Premier League Manager of the Season
Premier League Young Player of the Season

Notes

References
GeneralSpecific

season
England
Annual events in England
Annual sporting events in the United Kingdom
Awards established in 1995
Season
Association football player non-biographical articles